Basse-Terre Cathedral is a Roman Catholic cathedral dedicated to Our Lady of Guadalupe and a national monument of France, in the town of Basse-Terre in Guadeloupe.

References

External links
Location

Catholic Church in Guadeloupe
Roman Catholic cathedrals in France
Guadeloupean culture
Buildings and structures in Guadeloupe
Basilica churches in France
Roman Catholic cathedrals in Guadeloupe